The visa policy of Kosovo deals with the requirements which a foreign national wishing to enter Kosovo must meet to obtain a visa, which is a permit to travel to, enter and remain in Kosovo.

Visa policy map

Visa exemption
Since 1 July 2013, citizens of the following countries or territories with ordinary passports can visit without a visa for 90 days within 6-month period:

Notes
1 - May enter with a national ID card
2 - May enter with any proof of nationality
3 - May enter with a biometric national ID card

Visa is not required for citizens of any country with a valid multiple entry Schengen visa or a valid biometric residence permit from a Schengen State. They may stay in Kosovo for 15 days.

Diplomatic and service passports
Visa is not required for holders of diplomatic or service/official passports for 15 days of the following countries:

Visa is not required for holders of  diplomatic or official passports for 90 days.

Visa not required for holders of a Laissez-Passer issued by the United Nations traveling on duty.

See also

 Foreign relations of Kosovo
 Kosovan passport
 Visa requirements for Kosovan citizens

References

External links
MINISTRY OF FOREIGN AFFAIRS Visas for foreign citizens

Kosovo